Samum  was a castrum (fort) in the Roman province of Dacia, situated at the very northern border of that territory. It lay on the right (northern) side of the river Someș, in historical land later known as Transylvania, inside of present Romania. Remnants of this relatively small fortified camp lies within the cadastre of village Cășeiu (near the town of Dej),  to the southwest from the edge of the village.

This castrum in a typical square shape was built as an auxiliary military camp at the beginning of the 2nd century, in times of the Emperor Trajan, while it was fully abandoned (together with whole province of Dacia) after 270 AD, when Emperor Aurelian decided to give-up too difficultly defensible province.

See also
List of castra

External links
Roman castra from Romania - Google Maps / Earth

Notes

Roman legionary fortresses in Romania
Ancient history of Transylvania
Historic monuments in Cluj County